Kasper Akseli Puutio (born 3 June 2002) is a Finnish professional ice hockey defenceman for KalPa of the Finnish Liiga. He previously played for Oulun Kärpät.

Playing career
Puutio was drafted first overall by the Swift Current Broncos in the 2019 CHL Import Draft. He recorded one goal and 15 assists in 35 games for the Broncos. On 10 January 2020 he was traded to the Everett Silvertips. He recorded four goals and eight assists in 21 games for the Silvertips before the season was cancelled due to the COVID-19 pandemic.

Puutio was drafted in the fifth round, 153rd overall, by the Florida Panthers in the 2020 NHL Entry Draft. He made his professional debut for Oulun Kärpät during the 2020–21 season where he recorded two goals and one assist in 29 games. On 3 May 2021 he signed a two-year contract with KalPa.

International play

Puutio represented Finland at the 2021 World Junior Ice Hockey Championships where he recorded two assists in seven games and won a bronze medal.  He will again represent Finland at the 2022 World Junior Ice Hockey Championships.

Career statistics

Regular season and playoffs

International

References

External links
 

2002 births
Living people
Finnish expatriate ice hockey players in Canada
Finnish expatriate ice hockey players in the United States
Finnish ice hockey defencemen
Florida Panthers draft picks
Everett Silvertips players
KalPa players
Oulun Kärpät players
Swift Current Broncos players
Sportspeople from Vaasa